Agimat: Ang Mga Alamat ni Ramon Revilla Sr. Presents Tiagong Akyat, more popularly known as simply Tiagong Akyat was the first installment of the Philippine weekly mini-series Agimat: Ang Mga Alamat ni Ramon Revilla ("Amulet: The Legendary Chronicles of Ramon Revilla") aired by ABS-CBN August 15, 2009, and concluded on November 7, 2009.  The character of Tiagong Akyat is portrayed by Gerald Anderson opposite to her Leading Lady Erich Gonzales.

Overview

1973 film
Agimat: Ang mga Alamat ni Ramon Revilla Sr. presents Tiagong Akyat is a TV adaptation of a film entitled Huhulihin si... Tiagong Akyat ("Arrest Tiagong Akyat"), a 1973 film which gave Ramon Revilla, Sr. a FAMAS Best Actor trophy. "Tiagong Akyat" was the alias of Santiago Ronquillo,  a notorious thief who looted homes in Manila and nearby provinces in the 1920s.

Synopsis
The story follows the life of unconventional hero Santiago Ronquillo. Tiago is a streetwise orphan who, after acquiring the amulet known as the Pangil ng Kidlat ("Fang of  Lightning"), gains superhuman strength, speed and the ability to climb high walls that enhances his parkour abilities. He then uses his gift to steal from the corrupt to help the poor.

Plot
After many years, Tiago (Gerald Anderson) meets Cornelia (Erich Gonzales) and gets a chance to profess his love for her.  Cornelia's suitor Vincent becomes jealous of Tiago. Meanwhile, Cornelia's father Mayor Mariano is against his daughter's relationship with the impoverished Tiago. Cornelia decides to elope with Tiago and they plan to get married. One night, Cornelia tells Tiago that her father wants to meet him. Tiago goes to Mayor Mariano's house where he found him  bloody and unconscious. Vincent arrives and tells the guards to arrest Tiago. After killing Mayor Mariano, Vincent  frames Tiago for the murder. The court finds Tiago guilty and sentences him to life imprisonment. In jail, Tiago befriends  Big Max, Nardo, and Pablo. After learning that Cornelia had married Vincent, Tiago makes several attempts to escape but miserably fails. Years pass and Tiago discovers that the urban legend about the amulet called Pangil ng Kidlat is true when he meets Castro, the owner of the amulet.

Castro gives his amulet to Tiago, and before dying, he asks the young man to use the amulet to prove his innocence. Tiago, together with his newfound friends inside the prison, then successfully escape. Tiago intends to force Vincent to admit the truth. Cornelia hears from Vincent that he did murder Mayor Mariano, Cornelia's father. Tiago and Vincent struggle for the gun, and they accidentally shoot Cornelia. Before dying, Cornelia tells Tiago that she loves him, and that they have a son named Martin. Vincent tells the police and Martin that it was Tiago who killed Cornelia. With the help of his fellow fugitive, Tiago takes his son from Vincent. Nardo goes to the house of his sister Norma, and there Tiago tries to convince his son that he is a good man. Norma is worried that Tiago will only bring trouble, but she eventually understands his desire to win his son. She befriends Martin and helps the boy trust his own father. Tiago lets Martin hear the voice recording wherein Vincent admitted it was he who murdered Mayor Mariano.

Vincent asks Red's help in finding Tiago and getting Martin, and Red promises to use his influence. Meanwhile, Tiago and his friends decide to help  their poor neighbors by stealing from the wealthy and the corrupt. Just then, Red chases Tiago and shoots Tiago at the back hitting his heart but he survived because of his amulet, his fellow members learn about this, they ask Tiago and Tiago admits that it's because of his Agimat. Max then tells Pablo to steal the amulet but he gets caught by Tiago while they were asleep, then Max shoots Pablo dead. Vincent finally surrenders and gives back Martin to Tiago, as Police arrest Vincent, Max shows up and fires at Vincent. Tiago now was revealed to be innocent, he marries Norma and they celebrate. Max then burns down a house, causing the people to panic and tries to put out the fire. They then search for Martin, Martin then was abducted by Max, Tiago chases after him and he finds him cornered in the warehouse. Max convinces Tiago to give him the amulet and he will give Martin to him. Tiago then surrenders his amulet then Martin struggles and runs to Tiago's side, Tiago passes his amulet to Martin then Max shoots Tiago and they shoot each other. Martin then returns to see Tiago lying dead. After the incident, Tiago is buried in a cemetery where his family and neighbors visit him.

Cast

Main cast
Gerald Anderson as Santiago Ronquillo
Erich Gonzales as Cornelia Verde
Jason Abalos as Vincent Fajardo
Maxene Eigenmann as Norma Muñoz Ronquillo
Ryan Eigenmann as Big Max
Jayson Gainza as Father Baste
Danilo Barrios as Nardo Muñoz
Joseph Bitangcol as Pablo Reyes
Carlo Guevarra as Buboy Arnaiz
Arron Villaflor as Jigo Manuson
Nova Villa as Aling Marta
Daniel Fernando as Red Capulong
Bugoy Cariño as Martin Mariano Ronquillo
Eric Nicolas as PE/MSgt. Mercado

Special participation
Bing Davao as Mariano Verde
Pen Medina as Castro "Kastrong Bato" Manangkil
Neil Ryan Sese as Albert "Abet" Ronquillo
Elaine Quemuel as Anabel Ronquillo
Francis Magundayao as Teen Tiago
 Cheska Billiones as teen Cornelia
Basty Alcanses as teen Buboy
Carlo Lacana as teen Vincent
Andrei Garcia as teen Jigo
Joshua Dionisio as teen Baste
Mikee Lee as Badong

See also
Agimat: Ang Mga Alamat ni Ramon Revilla

References

External links
 

2009 Philippine television series debuts
2009 Philippine television series endings
ABS-CBN drama series
Filipino-language television shows
Parkour in fiction
Television series by Dreamscape Entertainment Television